Naturally occurring zinc (30Zn) is composed of the 5 stable isotopes 64Zn, 66Zn, 67Zn, 68Zn, and 70Zn with 64Zn being the most abundant (48.6% natural abundance). Twenty-five radioisotopes have been characterised with the most abundant and stable being 65Zn with a half-life of 244.26 days, and 72Zn with a half-life of 46.5 hours. All of the remaining radioactive isotopes have half-lives that are less than 14 hours and the majority of these have half-lives that are less than 1 second. This element also has 10 meta states.

Zinc has been proposed as a "salting" material for nuclear weapons. A jacket of isotopically enriched 64Zn, irradiated by the intense high-energy neutron flux from an exploding thermonuclear weapon, would transmute into the radioactive isotope 65Zn with a half-life of 244 days and produce approximately 1.115 MeV of gamma radiation, significantly increasing the radioactivity of the weapon's fallout for several years. Such a weapon is not known to have ever been built, tested, or used.

List of isotopes 

|-
| 54Zn
| style="text-align:right" | 30
| style="text-align:right" | 24
| 53.99295(43)#
| 1.59 ms
| 2p
| 52Ni
| 0+
|
|
|-
| rowspan=2|55Zn
| rowspan=2 style="text-align:right" | 30
| rowspan=2 style="text-align:right" | 25
| rowspan=2|54.98398(27)#
| rowspan=2|20# ms [>1.6 μs]
| 2p
| 53Ni
| rowspan=2|5/2−#
| rowspan=2|
| rowspan=2|
|-
| β+
| 55Cu
|-
| 56Zn
| style="text-align:right" | 30
| style="text-align:right" | 26
| 55.97238(28)#
| 36(10) ms
| β+
| 56Cu
| 0+
|
|
|-
| rowspan=2|57Zn
| rowspan=2 style="text-align:right" | 30
| rowspan=2 style="text-align:right" | 27
| rowspan=2|56.96479(11)#
| rowspan=2|38(4) ms
| β+, p (65%)
| 56Ni
| rowspan=2|7/2−#
| rowspan=2|
| rowspan=2|
|-
| β+ (35%)
| 57Cu
|-
| rowspan=2|58Zn
| rowspan=2 style="text-align:right" | 30
| rowspan=2 style="text-align:right" | 28
| rowspan=2|57.95459(5)
| rowspan=2|84(9) ms
| β+, p (60%)
| 57Ni
| rowspan=2|0+
| rowspan=2|
| rowspan=2|
|-
| β+ (40%)
| 58Cu
|-
| rowspan=2|59Zn
| rowspan=2 style="text-align:right" | 30
| rowspan=2 style="text-align:right" | 29
| rowspan=2|58.94926(4)
| rowspan=2|182.0(18) ms
| β+ (99%)
| 59Cu
| rowspan=2|3/2−
| rowspan=2|
| rowspan=2|
|-
| β+, p (1%)
| 58Ni
|-
| 60Zn
| style="text-align:right" | 30
| style="text-align:right" | 30
| 59.941827(11)
| 2.38(5) min
| β+
| 60Cu
| 0+
|
|
|-
| 61Zn
| style="text-align:right" | 30
| style="text-align:right" | 31
| 60.939511(17)
| 89.1(2) s
| β+
| 61Cu
| 3/2−
|
|
|-
| style="text-indent:1em" | 61m1Zn
| colspan="3" style="text-indent:2em" | 88.4(1) keV
| <430 ms
|
|
| 1/2−
|
|
|-
| style="text-indent:1em" | 61m2Zn
| colspan="3" style="text-indent:2em" | 418.10(15) keV
| 140(70) ms
|
|
| 3/2−
|
|
|-
| style="text-indent:1em" | 61m3Zn
| colspan="3" style="text-indent:2em" | 756.02(18) keV
| <130 ms
|
|
| 5/2−
|
|
|-
| 62Zn
| style="text-align:right" | 30
| style="text-align:right" | 32
| 61.934330(11)
| 9.186(13) h
| β+
| 62Cu
| 0+
|
|
|-
| 63Zn
| style="text-align:right" | 30
| style="text-align:right" | 33
| 62.9332116(17)
| 38.47(5) min
| β+
| 63Cu
| 3/2−
|
|
|-
| 64Zn
| style="text-align:right" | 30
| style="text-align:right" | 34
| 63.9291422(7)
| colspan=3 align=center|Observationally Stable
| 0+
| 0.4917(75)
|
|-
| 65Zn
| style="text-align:right" | 30
| style="text-align:right" | 35
| 64.9292410(7)
| 243.66(9) d
| β+
| 65Cu
| 5/2−
|
|
|-
| style="text-indent:1em" | 65mZn
| colspan="3" style="text-indent:2em" | 53.928(10) keV
| 1.6(6) μs
|
|
| (1/2)−
|
|
|-
| 66Zn
| style="text-align:right" | 30
| style="text-align:right" | 36
| 65.9260334(10)
| colspan=3 align=center|Stable
| 0+
| 0.2773(98)
|
|-
| 67Zn
| style="text-align:right" | 30
| style="text-align:right" | 37
| 66.9271273(10)
| colspan=3 align=center|Stable
| 5/2−
| 0.0404(16)
|
|-
| 68Zn
| style="text-align:right" | 30
| style="text-align:right" | 38
| 67.9248442(10)
| colspan=3 align=center|Stable
| 0+
| 0.1845(63)
|
|-
| 69Zn
| style="text-align:right" | 30
| style="text-align:right" | 39
| 68.9265503(10)
| 56.4(9) min
| β−
| 69Ga
| 1/2−
|
|
|-
| rowspan=2 style="text-indent:1em" | 69mZn
| rowspan=2 colspan="3" style="text-indent:2em" | 438.636(18) keV
| rowspan=2|13.76(2) h
| IT (96.7%)
| 69Zn
| rowspan=2|9/2+
| rowspan=2|
| rowspan=2|
|-
| β− (3.3%)
| 69Ga
|-
| 70Zn
| style="text-align:right" | 30
| style="text-align:right" | 40
| 69.9253193(21)
| colspan=3 align=center|Observationally Stable
| 0+
| 0.0061(10)
|
|-
| 71Zn
| style="text-align:right" | 30
| style="text-align:right" | 41
| 70.927722(11)
| 2.45(10) min
| β−
| 71Ga
| 1/2−
|
|
|-
| rowspan=2 style="text-indent:1em" | 71mZn
| rowspan=2 colspan="3" style="text-indent:2em" | 157.7(13) keV
| rowspan=2|3.96(5) h
| β− (99.95%)
| 71Ga
| rowspan=2|9/2+
| rowspan=2|
| rowspan=2|
|-
| IT (.05%)
| 71Zn
|-
| 72Zn
| style="text-align:right" | 30
| style="text-align:right" | 42
| 71.926858(7)
| 46.5(1) h
| β−
| 72Ga
| 0+
|
|
|-
| 73Zn
| style="text-align:right" | 30
| style="text-align:right" | 43
| 72.92978(4)
| 23.5(10) s
| β−
| 73Ga
| (1/2)−
|
|
|-
| style="text-indent:1em" | 73m1Zn
| colspan="3" style="text-indent:2em" | 195.5(2) keV
| 13.0(2) ms
|
|
| (5/2+)
|
|
|-
| rowspan=2 style="text-indent:1em" | 73m2Zn
| rowspan=2 colspan="3" style="text-indent:2em" | 237.6(20) keV
| rowspan=2|5.8(8) s
| β−
| 73Ga
| rowspan=2|(7/2+)
| rowspan=2|
| rowspan=2|
|-
| IT
| 73Zn
|-
| 74Zn
| style="text-align:right" | 30
| style="text-align:right" | 44
| 73.92946(5)
| 95.6(12) s
| β−
| 74Ga
| 0+
|
|
|-
| 75Zn
| style="text-align:right" | 30
| style="text-align:right" | 45
| 74.93294(8)
| 10.2(2) s
| β−
| 75Ga
| (7/2+)#
|
|
|-
| 76Zn
| style="text-align:right" | 30
| style="text-align:right" | 46
| 75.93329(9)
| 5.7(3) s
| β−
| 76Ga
| 0+
|
|
|-
| 77Zn
| style="text-align:right" | 30
| style="text-align:right" | 47
| 76.93696(13)
| 2.08(5) s
| β−
| 77Ga
| (7/2+)#
|
|
|-
| rowspan=2 style="text-indent:1em" | 77mZn
| rowspan=2 colspan="3" style="text-indent:2em" | 772.39(12) keV
| rowspan=2|1.05(10) s
| IT (50%)
| 77Zn
| rowspan=2|1/2−#
| rowspan=2|
| rowspan=2|
|-
| β− (50%)
| 77Ga
|-
| 78Zn
| style="text-align:right" | 30
| style="text-align:right" | 48
| 77.93844(10)
| 1.47(15) s
| β−
| 78Ga
| 0+
|
|
|-
| style="text-indent:1em" | 78mZn
| colspan="3" style="text-indent:2em" | 2673(1) keV
| 319(9) ns
|
|
| (8+)
|
|
|-
| rowspan=2|79Zn
| rowspan=2 style="text-align:right" | 30
| rowspan=2 style="text-align:right" | 49
| rowspan=2|78.94265(28)#
| rowspan=2|0.995(19) s
| β− (98.7%)
| 79Ga
| rowspan=2|(9/2+)
| rowspan=2|
| rowspan=2|
|-
| β−, n (1.3%)
| 78Ga
|-
| rowspan=2|80Zn
| rowspan=2 style="text-align:right" | 30
| rowspan=2 style="text-align:right" | 50
| rowspan=2|79.94434(18)
| rowspan=2|545(16) ms
| β− (99%)
| 80Ga
| rowspan=2|0+
| rowspan=2|
| rowspan=2|
|-
| β−, n (1%)
| 79Ga
|-
| rowspan=2|81Zn
| rowspan=2 style="text-align:right" | 30
| rowspan=2 style="text-align:right" | 51
| rowspan=2|80.95048(32)#
| rowspan=2|290(50) ms
| β− (92.5%)
| 81Ga
| rowspan=2|5/2+#
| rowspan=2|
| rowspan=2|
|-
| β−, n (7.5%)
| 80Ga
|-
| 82Zn
| style="text-align:right" | 30
| style="text-align:right" | 52
| 81.95442(54)#
| 100# ms [>300 ns]
| β−
| 82Ga
| 0+
|
|
|-
| 83Zn
| style="text-align:right" | 30
| style="text-align:right" | 53
| 82.96103(54)#
| 80# ms [>300 ns]
|
|
| 5/2+#
|
|

References 

 Isotope masses from:

 Isotopic compositions and standard atomic masses from:

 Half-life, spin, and isomer data selected from the following sources.

External links
Zinc isotopes data from The Berkeley Laboratory Isotopes Project's

 
Zinc